Man of Conquest is a 1939 American Western film directed by George Nicholls Jr. and starring Richard Dix, Gail Patrick, and Joan Fontaine. The film was nominated for three Academy Awards for Best Score, Best Sound (Charles L. Lootens), and Best Art Direction (John Victor Mackay).

The film marked the first serious attempt by Republic Pictures to break out from its traditional production of B movies and produce a work of greater cost and prestige. The film is a biopic of the politician Sam Houston, focusing on his relationship with Andrew Jackson and his role during the Texas Revolution. It was inspired by Marquis James's 1929 Pulitzer Prize-winning biography of Houston.

Plot
Sam Houston fights beside his friend Andrew Jackson and is wounded. Not long thereafter, Jackson is elected President of the United States and appoints Houston as governor of Tennessee.

Houston is married to Eliza Allen, but his lifestyle as a politician does not appeal to her. Their divorce is somewhat scandalous for the time, and Houston decides to accept Jackson's suggestion that he become ambassador to the Cherokee tribe instead.

On a trip to Washington, DC, to put forth his argument how the Indians are being mistreated in their own land, Houston falls in love with Margaret Lea at a presidential ball. She returns with him to Texas, where the next mission for Houston is to free the territory from the rule of Mexico, either by diplomacy or on the battlefield.

Stephen F. Austin disagrees with Houston's methods, preferring peaceful negotiations, but when the army of Santa Ana heads toward The Alamo in tremendous numbers, Houston knows no peaceful settlement is possible. He arrives too late to prevent the carnage there, but then leads the Texans in their fight for freedom and statehood.

Cast

Richard Dix as Sam Houston
Gail Patrick as Margaret Lea
Edward Ellis as Andrew Jackson
Joan Fontaine as Eliza Allen
Victor Jory as William B. Travis
Robert Barrat as David Crockett
George 'Gabby' Hayes as Lannie Upchurch 
Ralph Morgan as Stephen F. Austin
Robert Armstrong as Jim Bowie
C. Henry Gordon as Santa Ana
Janet Beecher as Mrs. Sarah Lea
Pedro de Cordoba as Oolooteka
Max Terhune as Deaf Smith
Kathleen Lockhart as Mrs. Allen
Russell Hicks as Mr. Allen 
Leon Ames as John Hoskins
Olaf Hytten as Footman (uncredited) 
Ethan Laidlaw as Fighter (uncredited)
Francis Sayles as Martin Van Buren  (uncredited) 
Charles Stevens as Zavola (uncredited)

Other use
Republic Pictures contributed footage from scenes dealing with Sam Houston and the Alamo in the not-yet-completed film for inclusion in the 1939 documentary Land of Liberty.

References

Bibliography
 Hurst, Richard M. Republic Studios: Between Poverty Row and the Majors. Scarecrow Press, 2007.

External links

1939 films
1930s historical films
1939 Western (genre) films
American historical films
American biographical films
American black-and-white films
American Western (genre) films
1930s English-language films
Films scored by Victor Young
Films set in Texas
Films set in Tennessee
Films set in the 1830s
Films about Andrew Jackson
Films directed by George Nicholls Jr.
Films produced by Sol C. Siegel
Cultural depictions of Davy Crockett
Republic Pictures films
Texas Revolution films
1930s American films
Cultural depictions of James Bowie